Gustavo Cabral Narciso Gianetti (born May 21, 1979) is a Brazilian male model and beauty pageant contestant who was elected Mister World in 2003. He entered the pageant as Mister Brazil 2001.

Biography
He studied law at the University of Juiz de Fora, with the ambition of becoming an international tax lawyer. He is also a model and has appeared in several television programmes including Britain's Next Top Model and Miss Brazil 2004 Gianetti has won prizes as a Capoeira fighter.

In 2007, Gianetti appeared on 'Britain's Next Top Model'.  The models were sent to Brazil for their international destination during which they were given an acting challenge.  Gianetti played their love interest in short scenes where the models had to speak Portuguese, and kiss and push Gianetti away.

External links

1979 births
Living people
People from Belo Horizonte
Brazilian people of Portuguese descent
Brazilian people of Italian descent
Mister World winners
Brazilian male models
Brazilian capoeira practitioners
Male beauty pageant winners
Brazilian beauty pageant winners